Under the Weather is a Canadian animated short film, directed by Tali Prévost and released in 1997. The film centres on a group of people who are happily enjoying the beach in cloudy weather, but run to take shelter as soon as the sun comes out.

The film was a Genie Award nominee for Best Animated Short Film at the 18th Genie Awards in 1997.

References

External links
 

1997 short films
1997 films
1997 animated films
Canadian animated short films
National Film Board of Canada animated short films
1990s Canadian films